"Futurology" is the second single released by the Manic Street Preachers from their twelfth studio album, Futurology. The song features keyboards from Super Furry Animals member Cian Ciaran. The single was released on 22 September 2014. It is a duet between James Dean Bradfield, the main vocalist, and Nicky Wire, the band's bassist.

Background

The song was first revealed at the Manic Street Preachers tour in the First Direct Arena on 28 March 2014, where the band debuted songs from their new album. On a track by track made by Gigwise the song was described as: "Brief bubbling space-age noises introduce the title track before a burst of Everything Must Go guitars kick off. The positive pine of Bradfield's vocal acts as an immediate sign that this is not going to be The Holy Bible pt II - or a continuation of any of their past work at all. While it may be a wonderfully typically Manics slice of arena rock, this track has a spirit to it that you've not heard from the band before."

According to the band, the song and lyrics were both written by Wire, and he said that the song, in a way, reflects the belief in humanity, where Wire has the faith that something positive will happen, thus the chorus: We'll come back one day, we never really went away (...).

The song, according to the band, came really naturally, and it was a critical aspect that pointed the positive vibe that the all record has, being one of the most optimistic records ever that the Manic Street Preachers have produced and released.  The song was recorded in Hansa Studios in Berlin, like most of the album.

Release

The song was made available by Digital download on Monday, 22 September, besides the single, it contains two extra songs, Antisocialmanifesto and Kodawari. It also featured a remix of Futurology made by R. Seiliog.

Music video
The music video directed by Kieran Evans was uploaded to the band's official VEVO account on YouTube on 10 August 2014.

Track listing

Personnel 

 Manic Street Preachers

 James Dean Bradfield – lead vocals, guitar
 Nicky Wire – vocals, bass guitar
 Sean Moore – drums

Other personnel

 Loz Williams - production
 Cian Ciaran -   keyboards 
 Kieran Evans - music video

References

External links 

 NME article on the song

Manic Street Preachers songs
2014 songs
2014 singles
Columbia Records singles
Songs written by James Dean Bradfield
Songs written by Nicky Wire
Songs written by Sean Moore (musician)
Male vocal duets